Enchantress, in comics, may refer to:

 Enchantress (Marvel Comics), a native of Asgard 
 Enchantress (DC Comics), a former superhero

See also
Enchantress (disambiguation)